Alice Dugged Cary, also known as Alice Dugged Carey (September 1859 – September 25, 1941), was an American educator and librarian.

Biography
Alice Dugged was born in New London, Indiana, in 1859. Her parents were John Richard Dugged and Josie A. (Gilliam) Dugged and she had two siblings.

She was educated in public schools in Marshall, Michigan, and graduated Wilberforce University in 1881. She began her teaching career in the public schools of Kansas in 1882. She became assistant principal at Lincoln High School, Kansas City, Missouri, in 1884, and the following year she married the Rev. Jefferson Alexander Carey Jr, a minister of the A.M.E. Church. They moved to Atlanta, Georgia, where she accepted an appointment in 1886 as the second principal of Morris Brown College. In 1887 she was the first principal of the Mitchell Street School, a position she held concurrently with her university role.

In 1921 she was appointed the first librarian of the Auburn Carnegie Library in Atlanta, the first library in the city accessible to African Americans under segregation. She also established the second branch of the Zeta Phi Beta sorority in that year. Cary was politically active, serving as the Georgia State Chairman of the Colored Woman's Committee, and as president of the Georgia State Federation of Coloured Women.

She died in Atlanta, Georgia, in 1941 and was buried at South-View Cemetery.

References

Sources

External links
 
 "Alice Dugged Cary", Relief Sculpture by Brian R. Owens

1859 births
1941 deaths
African-American activists
19th-century African-American women
19th-century American women
20th-century African-American women
20th-century African-American people
Academics from Indiana
Activists for African-American civil rights
African-American academics
African-American librarians
American librarians
American women librarians
Burials at South-View Cemetery
People from Atlanta
Zeta Phi Beta